The 1896–97 season is the 23rd season of competitive football by Rangers.

Overview
Rangers played a total of 22 competitive matches during the 1896–97 season. They finished third in the Scottish League Division One with a record of 11 wins from 18 matches.

The club won the Scottish Cup that season. A 5–1 victory of Dumbarton on 20 March 1897 saw them win the trophy for only the second time in the club's history.

Results
All results are written with Rangers' score first.

Scottish League Division One

Scottish Cup

Appearances

See also
 1896–97 in Scottish football
 1896–97 Scottish Cup

External links
Team photo hosted at media storehouse

Rangers F.C. seasons
Ran